Fundata is a commune in Brașov County, Romania, in the historic region of Transylvania. It is composed of three villages: Fundata, Fundățica (Kleinkertzberg; Kisfundáta), and Șirnea (Schirnen; Sirnea). The place offers panoramas for the Piatra Craiului Mountains and Bucegi Mountains. During the 2013 European Youth Olympic Winter Festival, it held the biathlon competition in the new venue of the town.

Presentation

Surrounded by the Bucegi Mountains and the Piatra Craiului Mountains, Fundata's altitude of  makes it the highest commune in Romania. Șirnea was first attested in 1729, and Fundata in 1732. It lies on the southern border of Brașov County, with Argeș County on the other side, in the middle of the Rucăr-Bran Pass, along European route E574.

In August 1916, when troops from the Romanian Old Kingdom entered Austria-Hungary, the first village they took was Fundata, also capturing their first prisoners there and suffering their first battle death.

A traditional lifestyle of herding sheep and cows is preserved, augmented by tourism. Indeed, Șirnea was declared the country's first tourist village in 1968. Aside from the mountainous scenery, attractions in Fundata include a wooden Romanian Orthodox church (1830) and one of stone (1939–1943); in Șirnea, there is a church from 1893–1894 as well as an ethnographic museum. There is an annual festival held around July 20, feast of the prophet Elijah, called Nedeia Munților ("Mountain Celebration"). Originally a "feast of two countries" (Transylvania and Wallachia), it was revived in 1969, and features folklore displays as well as local cheeses and meats.

At the 2011 census, all but one of the commune's inhabitants were ethnic Romanians.

Natives
Gheorghe Bădescu
Ion Țeposu

Gallery

Notes

Communes in Brașov County
Localities in Transylvania